Palandöken Ski Center is a ski resort for alpine skiing and snowboarding on the Palandöken Mountain in Erzurum Province, eastern Turkey.

It was established 
for the 2011 Winter Universiade. Skiing season at the resort begins in average late October ending in the first weeks of May in the higher regions. The runs "Ejder" and "Kapıkaya" are the longest ones. They are Olympic-sized and are suitable for slalom skiing and giant slalom disciplines.

The runs of Palandöken Ski Resort are served by aerial lifts such as eight chairlifts of various size and one gondola lift, all having a total hourly transport capacity of 8,100 skiers.

Hotels at the ski resort provide accommodation in addition to the lodging establishments in the city. 

The runs are illuminated so that skiing can be performed in the darkness that begins to fall at about 16:00 hours local time.. The illumination of the runs were intensified in January 2017.

In December 2012, the operation rights were transferred from the Turkey Ski Federation to the Youth Services and Sports Directorate of Erzurum Province. The ski resort remained inactive after the 2011 Winter Universiade finished. The ski resort's operation was transferred to the Erzurum Metropolitan Municipality in September 2016.

International events hosted
 2011 Winter Universiade, 27 January – 6 February – snowboarding and freestyle skiing competitions.
 2017 European Youth Olympic Winter Festival, 12 – 17 February – Alpine Skiing and snowboarding.

References

External links
Palandöken Kayak Merkezi

Sports venues in Erzurum
Ski areas and resorts in Turkey
Buildings and structures in Erzurum Province
2011 establishments in Turkey
Sports venues completed in 2011
Tourist attractions in Erzurum Province